Marvin Arneson (born 7 July 1943) is a Canadian boxer. He competed in the men's lightweight event at the 1968 Summer Olympics. At the 1968 Summer Olympics, he lost to John Stracey of Great Britain.

References

External links
 

1943 births
Living people
Canadian male boxers
Olympic boxers of Canada
Boxers at the 1968 Summer Olympics
Place of birth missing (living people)
Lightweight boxers